The Department of Water is a defunct department of the Government of Western Australia that was responsible for management of Western Australia's water resources.

It was replaced by the Department of Water and Environmental Regulation (Western Australia) on 1 July 2017.

The department provides information to industry, technical support and professional guidance to government on the status of water and the viability of new water source developments.  It also issues licences for artesian groundwater wells throughout the state.

References

External links
  Department of Water and Environmental Regulation 

Water
Water supply and sanitation in Western Australia
2006 establishments in Australia
2017 disestablishments in Australia
Government agencies established in 2006
Government agencies disestablished in 2017